The 1909 San Diego mayoral election was held on April 6, 1909 to elect the mayor for San Diego. Incumbent Mayor John F. Forward Sr. and Grant Conard received the most votes in the primary election and advanced to the runoff. Conard was then elected mayor with a majority of the votes.

Candidates
John F. Forward Sr., Mayor of San Diego
Grant Conard, 1907 mayoral candidate
W.J. Kirkwood, 1905 mayoral candidate

Campaign
Incumbent Mayor John F. Forward Sr. stood for reelection on the Republican ticket. Grant Conard, who was previously the runner up in the 1907 election, once again challenged Forward as a Republican running a non-political campaign. Also contesting the race was W.J. Kirkwood, a Socialist.

The 1909 election was the first to be held in San Diego using the primary election system. On March 23, 1909, Forward and Conard received the two highest vote totals and advanced to the general election. Conard was then elected mayor on April 6, 1909 with a majority of the votes in the runoff.

Primary Election results

General Election results

References

1909
1909 California elections
1909
1909 United States mayoral elections
April 1909 events